Jubellidae is a family of bryozoans belonging to the order Cheilostomatida.

Genera:
 Jubella Jullien, 1882

References

Cheilostomatida